Kaolin spray is a pest control that has kaolin as the main ingredient. The practice has been in recorded use from 2000 B.C.E. in China. More recent studies have shown that kaolin sprays can promote photosynthesis and are effective in reducing insects and disease on plants.

Description 
Kaolin is a rock rich with the clay mineral kaolintite. Kaolin spray is a pest control that has kaolin as the main ingredient.

History 
In nature, many animal species commonly take "dust baths" to rid themselves of insect parasites and prevent attacks from biting insects.  In 2000 B.C.E., ancient records in China describe the application of mineral-based dusts (e.g., diatomaceous earth) to plants to control insects.  Since that time, there is a long history on the use of various mineral-based preparations and some of these are still used for special purposes in agricultural pest control.

More recently, kaolin mixed with spreaders and stickers and applied to plants as a spray at 1–6% concentration in water form has been shown to be an effective approach to agricultural pest control and to protect plants from environmental stresses. Kaolin-based sprays have been studied extensively since 1999 and research has established that these sprays deposit a "particle film" that has numerous beneficial effects on plants and in insect pest control. Certain kaolin-based sprays can form a highly reflective white film over plant surfaces that is known to enhance plant photosynthesis and reduce heat stress in plants, which they do by reflecting the infra-red light spectrum, which in the end improves plant yields and fruit quality in orchards. The kaolin barrier created by the particle film also protects the treated plant surfaces from diseases, and insects.

Kaolin sprays are used for pest control and sunburn protection in both conventional and organic food production in the United States and abroad. Commercial forms of kaolin-based particle films are currently used in the western United States to control pear pests and to protect apples from sunburn damage. Kaolin sprays are also used internationally for specific insect pests and sunburn problems in apples, pear, citrus, pomegranates, and vegetables.  Kaolin is generally regarded as safe to humans and has long history of use in the paint, plastics, pharmaceutical, and paper industry.

See also
 Medicinal clay
 Mechanical pest control

References 

Pest control techniques